Once Upon a Time in Tibet is a 2010 Chinese romantic comedy film directed and co-produced by Dai Wei, and starring Peter Ho, Joshua Hannum, Song Jia, Zhu Ziyan, Tino Bao, and Sam-Co. The film is an adaptation of Tashi Dawa's novel Cats of Shambala. The film tells the story of Robert and Yong Cuo's transnational love story.

Cast
 Song Jia as Yong Cuo, a kind of simple Tibetan women and a single mother.
 Joshua Hannum as Robert, an American pilot.
 Peter Ho as Jiang Cuo, a young Tibetan serf, he loves Yang Jin.
 Zhu Ziyan as Yang Jin, a Tibetan herdsmen's daughter, she loves Jiang Cuo.
  Tino Bao as ROC Commissioner for Tibet.
 Sam-Co

Music
 Tan Weiwei and Chongshol Dolma - Pray
 Zhu Ziyan - Life

Production
Production started in September 2009 and ended on March 17, 2010.

The film was shot in Tibetan Plateau, including Nagqu Prefecture and Namtso.

Release
The film was released on October 16, 2010, in China.

Accolades

References

External links
 
 
 

Films about Tibet
Tibetan-language films
Films shot in Tibet
Chinese romantic comedy-drama films
Films based on Chinese novels
2010 romantic comedy-drama films
2010 films
2010 comedy films
2010 drama films
2010s Mandarin-language films